The Beaus were an English three-piece indie/hip-hop group from Doncaster, South Yorkshire, England. They were signed by the independent South Yorkshire-based record label Circuit Records.

Amongst other things they have been featured on 2010's Festival Harvest compilation, headlined the Yorkshire Music Showcase at Liverpool Sound City and featured in Mexico's Warp Magazine.

References

External links
 the beaus homepage

English hip hop groups